Pearl Mill Village Historic District is a national historic district located at Durham, Durham County, North Carolina. The district encompasses 26 contributing residential buildings built by owners of Pearl Cotton Mills. The mill village dwellings are either two-story duplex type built about 1905 or a one-story bungalow constructed about 1924.

It was listed on the National Register of Historic Places in 1985.

References

Historic districts on the National Register of Historic Places in North Carolina
Historic districts in Durham, North Carolina
National Register of Historic Places in Durham County, North Carolina
Neighborhoods in Durham, North Carolina